Marcus Vinicius Barbosa Meloni (born 25 June 2000) is a Brazilian footballer who currently plays for Sharjah.

Career statistics

Club

Notes

References

External links

2000 births
Living people
Brazilian footballers
Brazilian expatriate footballers
Association football defenders
UAE Pro League players
Sociedade Esportiva Palmeiras players
Sharjah FC players
Expatriate footballers in the United Arab Emirates
Brazilian expatriate sportspeople in the United Arab Emirates
Footballers from São Paulo